Boramae Medical Center Station is a station on Sillim Line. It is located in Sindaebang-dong, Dongjak-gu, Seoul.

References

Seoul Metropolitan Subway stations
Railway stations opened in 2022
Metro stations in Dongjak District